Julius Hermann von Kirchmann (5 November 1802 – 20 October 1884) was a German jurist and philosopher.

Biography
Kirchmann was educated at Leipzig and Halle. In 1846 he was made state's attorney in the criminal court of Berlin, and two years afterwards was chosen to the Prussian National Assembly. From 1871 to 1876 he was a member of the German Reichstag. His philosophy was an attempt to mediate between realism and idealism.

Writings
Kirchmann first attracted attention as a philosopher by his brochure Die Wertlosigkeit der Jurisprudenz als Wissenschaft (The worthlessness of jurisprudence as a body of knowledge; 1848). His other philosophical writings include: Ueber Unsterblichkeit (On immortality; 1865), Aesthetik auf realistischer Grundlage (A realistic foundation for aesthetics; 1868); translations of parts of Aristotle, Roger Bacon, Hugo Grotius, David Hume, Gottfried Wilhelm Leibniz, and Baruch Spinoza, and a remarkable edition of Immanuel Kant in the Philosophische Bibliothek, edited by him (1868 et seq.), and of Thomas Hobbes' De Cive (1873).

Notes

References
   This work in turn cites:
 Lasson and Meineke, Julius von Kirchmann als Philosoph (Halle, 1885)

External links
 

1802 births
1884 deaths
People from Saalekreis
People from the Electorate of Saxony
German Protestants
German Progress Party politicians
Members of the Prussian House of Representatives
Members of the 1st Reichstag of the German Empire
Members of the 2nd Reichstag of the German Empire
Jurists from Saxony-Anhalt
19th-century German philosophers
German male writers
Leipzig University alumni
University of Halle alumni
Member of the Prussian National Assembly